In computer algebra, a regular semi-algebraic system is a particular kind of triangular  system  of multivariate polynomials over a real closed field.

Introduction 
Regular chains and triangular decompositions are fundamental and well-developed tools for describing the complex solutions of polynomial systems. The notion of a regular semi-algebraic system is an adaptation of the concept of a regular chain focusing on solutions of the real analogue: semi-algebraic systems.

Any semi-algebraic system  can be decomposed into finitely many regular semi-algebraic systems  such that a point (with real coordinates) is a solution of  if and only if it is a solution of one of the systems .

Formal definition 

Define . We say that  is a regular semi-algebraic system if the following three conditions hold.

Observe that  has dimension  in the affine space .

See also 
Real algebraic geometry

References 

Equations
Algebra
Polynomials
Algebraic geometry
Computer algebra